Warrior Rock may refer to:

 Warrior Rock: Toyah on Tour, an album by Toyah
 Warrior Rock Light, a lighthouse on the Columbia River near Portland, Oregon